The Mount Apo forest mouse (Apomys hylocetes)  is a species of rodent in the family Muridae.
It is found only in the Philippines.

References

Apomys
Rodents of the Philippines
Endemic fauna of the Philippines
Fauna of Mindanao
Mammals described in 1905
Taxonomy articles created by Polbot